Gili Gili is a village in Milne Bay Province, Papua New Guinea. The village is located between Swinger Bay-Alotau to the east and Ladava to the west in Milne Bay north shore.

Gili Gili Dock
Gili Gili Dock was naval loading and unloading dock, with both a jetty and pontoon wharf at Gili Gili (also spelled Gill Gill). Both the Australian Armed Forces (HMAS Ladava) and United States Navy (Naval Base Milne Bay) used the dock. On September 6, 1942, the MV Anshun was sunk at Gili Gili Dock by the Japanese cruiser Tenryū. She was refloated and repaired. 

Turnbull Field No. 3 Strip, was inland from the Gili Gili Dock and Swinger Bay Base amphibious training center just to the east of Gili Gili Dock. Gili Gili also became a U.S. Army staging area with a large tent camp.

See also
U.S. Naval Base Subic Bay
Espiritu Santo Naval Base
US Naval Advance Bases
Battle of Milne Bay order of battle

External links

 youtube US Navy PT Boat base at Milne Bay, July 1943
youtube US Navy PT Boats in Milne Bay, New Georgia Islands 1944
 Milne Bay Memorial Library and Research Centre
youtube, The Battle of Milne Bay - The Unknown Turning Point of the Pacific War

References

Populated places in Milne Bay Province